From January 1822 to July 1823, the five Central American nations of Costa Rica, El Salvador, Guatemala, Honduras, and Nicaragua were controlled by the First Mexican Empire, and briefly, the Supreme Executive Power. Collectively known as the Captaincy General of Guatemala, each nation was one of the five southernmost provinces of the Mexican Empire. This incorporation of Central America brought Mexico to the height of its territorial extent.

Only two months after the Act of Independence of Central America was signed in September 1821, Regent of Mexico Agustín de Iturbide, later the Mexican emperor, made a formal request to the Central American government to accept annexation to the Mexican Empire. His request was accepted by the Consultive Junta of Guatemala City on 5 January 1822. Despite the acceptance by the Guatemalan-based government in favor of annexation, El Salvador, Costa Rica, and parts of Nicaragua resisted Mexican annexation, forcing Mexican and allied Guatemalan soldiers to forcefully subjugate the rebellious regions of Central America.

Mexican and allied Guatemalan forces were commanded by Brigadier Vicente Filísola, who was serving as the captain general of the Central American provinces. They spent just over a year on a campaign to forcefully annex El Salvador, which ended in a Mexican victory and El Salvador's annexation in February 1823. In Costa Rica, the government declared independence from Mexico in October 1822, however, a coup by monarchists in March 1823 led to the outbreak of a civil war. The Battle of Ochomogo deposed the monarchist government and reestablished the secessionist government. Meanwhile, a rebellion in Nicaragua led by José Anacleto Ordóñez sought to overthrow the incumbent Nicaraguan government.

Before Filísola could continue to Nicaragua and Costa Rica after his victory in El Salvador, Agustín was forced to abdicate the Mexican imperial throne and go into exile, and a provisional government was established after the abolition of the monarchy. As a result, Filísola abandoned his orders to continue the conquest of Central America and convened a congress of Central American political leaders to determine the future of Central America.

On 1 July 1823, the Central American congress declared independence from Mexico and established the United Provinces of Central America, later known as the Federal Republic of Central America, which existed until its dissolution in 1841 after the First and Second Central American Civil Wars. Not all of Central America chose to become independent, however, as the region of Chiapas remained a part of Mexico and is now one of the country's 31 states.

Independence of New Spain

Mexican independence 

On 16 September 1810, criollo priest Miguel Hidalgo y Costilla issued the Cry of Dolores, beginning the Mexican War of Independence from the Spanish Empire in New Spain—Spain's colony that encompassed modern-day Mexico, Central America, and the southwestern United States. His declaration was made as a result of Napoleon's invasion of Spain, which overthrew Spanish King Ferdinand VII and replaced him with Napoleon's brother, Joseph I. Although Ferdinand VII was restored in 1814, the constitution of 1812 was suspended, and some in New Spain were not satisfied with his reign. In 1820, high-ranking military officers in New Spain demanded that the constitution be reinstated.

On 24 February 1821, Agustín de Iturbide, a Mexican general fighting for independence, published his Plan of the Three Guarantees in the city of Iguala, outlining his vision for the new independent Mexican state. It included the establishment of a constitutional monarchy. It also issued special protections to the Catholic Church, which would also be declared as the state religion; to the army; and to both Europeans and mestizos. Agustín invited Ferdinand VII, any member of his immediate family, or any other Spanish Bourbon prince to rule as the emperor of Mexico. Until an emperor could be appointed, Agustín held the position of president of the regency council unopposed.

After eleven years of war between Mexican independence forces and Spanish royalist forces, Mexico attained full independence in 1821 with the Treaty of Córdoba on 24 August and the Declaration of Independence of the Mexican Empire on 28 September.

Central American independence 

Both attempts were suppressed by Spanish forces. Despite the opposition to independence by some Central American leaders, such as Gabino Gaínza, on 15 September 1821, Central America declared independence from Spain with the Act of Independence of Central America, signed in Guatemala City. Independence was pursued in part because of Agustín's Plan of the Three Guarantees, which was very popular within Central America.

Upon independence, the Captaincy General of Guatemala was abolished and the former provinces of Costa Rica, El Salvador, Guatemala, Honduras, and Nicaragua became semi-independent nations under a provisional national government—the Consultive Junta—which was established in Guatemala to help form a formal federal government for Central America. Elections for a permanent government were scheduled to occur on 1 March 1822. The Spanish-appointed provincial governors remained in place and continued to exercise their authority after independence was declared. The independence of Central America was not considered to be a priority by Spain, due to its relative insignificance in comparison to their other colonies of New Granada, New Spain, and Peru, which they were still fighting for control of.

Central American infighting over annexation 

Immediately after independence, prospect of annexation to Mexico divided the Central American ruling class. Monarchist politicians preferred annexation, while more nationalist and republican politicians opposed annexation and wished to retain independence.

Politicians from the cities of León and Comayagua were also in favor. Although most indigenous Central Americans did not have an opinion on the issue of annexation, the Kʼicheʼ were in favor of annexation.

Manuel José Arce, a Salvadoran politician, was one of the primary opponents to annexation and a leading republican figure. Although some parts of El Salvador sought annexation, the capital city, San Salvador, firmly supported independence. On 4 October 1821, Arce was arrested along with several other Salvadoran politicians by Pedro Barriere, the conservative political chief of El Salvador. He was arrested for calling on Barriere to hold elections to elect a delegation to be sent to the Consultive Junta. As a result, the Consultive Junta decided to remove Barriere on 11 October 1821 and replace him with Salvadoran priest José Matías Delgado, freeing Arce in the process. Meanwhile, Costa Ricans were initially opposed to independence from Spain; at that time, there was no definitive consensus as to whether Costa Rica favored or opposed annexation. Gaínza did not wish to hold a meeting of Central America's political leaders, fearing that disagreements from the meeting could contribute to the outbreak of a civil war within Central America.

On 28 November 1821, Gaínza received a letter from Agustín formally requesting the annexation of Central America into the Mexican Empire. In the letter, Agustín stated that stability and security in Central America could only be possible if it joined a union with Mexico. He claimed to be seeking harmony with the Central American people, but he also stated that he was sending soldiers to Central America to ensure that order would be protected. On 20 November 1821, Agustín had already sent 200 soldiers into Chiapas, which declared its separation from Guatemala on 26 September 1821, to seize control of the area.

In response to the letter, Gaínza ordered all 237 municipalities across Central America to publish Agustín's letter publicly, hold open cabildos, and vote on annexation within thirty days. The result of the open cabildos was a decision in favor of complete annexation without any conditions.

Although the issued final report of the poll did not give exact details on how each municipality voted, Gaínza assured the public that the 104 municipalities which voted in favor of complete annexation without any conditions represented a majority of the population. As such, on 5 January 1822, the Consultive Junta voted in unconditional support for the annexation of Central America to the Mexican Empire. As a result of the annexation, Mexico reached the height of its territorial extent, and the people of Central America were automatically granted Mexican citizenship. The Consultive Junta was later dissolved on 21 February 1822.

The Act of Union of the Provinces of Central America with the Mexican Empire, which formalized Central America's annexation to Mexico, was signed by fourteen people. The fourteen signatories were:

 Gabino Gaínza
 Mariano de Aycinena y Piñol
 Miguel Larreynaga
 José Cecilio del Valle
 Mariano Beltranena y Llano
 
 Antonio Rivera Cabezas
 
 José Antonio Alvarado
 
 Eusebio Castillo
 José Valdés
 José Domingo Diéguez
 Mariano Gálvez

Annexation and subsequent separatist conflicts 

Brigadier Vicente Filísola was appointed by Agustín to command the Mexican soldiers to occupy Central America and solidify Mexican control in the region. The only active resistance against the annexation was in Costa Rica, El Salvador, and Nicaragua. Republican politicians in El Salvador attempted to usurp authority of Central America from Guatemala City and lead a region-wide resistance to Mexican occupation.

Suppression of Salvadoran resistance 

Arce and Delgado organized an armed Salvadoran resistance and prepared to engage in battle with Mexican forces. Gaínza, who was serving as the captain general of Central America, dedicated Guatemalan soldiers to support the Mexicans in March 1822 and placed them under the command of Chilean Sergeant . Salvadoran and Guatemalan forces clashed in the town of El Espinal on 3 March 1822, ending in a Salvadoran victory which forced Abós y Padilla's soldiers to retreat. Gaínza discharged Abós y Padilla and replaced him with Manuel Arzú on 19 March 1822, and also supplied him with more soldiers. Arzú's army succeeded in occupying San Salvador on 5 April 1822 and forced Salvadoran soldiers to abandon the city.

Filísola remained in Chiapas as Guatemalan forces occupied San Salvador. After requests from the Guatemalan government for his presence, Filísola arrived at Guatemala City on 12 June 1822. He succeeded Gaínza as the captain general and political chief of Central America on 23 June 1822. On 30 August 1822, Filísola negotiated an armistice with El Salvador, ending tensions between Mexico, Guatemala, and El Salvador. The delegations which negotiated the armistice included Antonio José Cañas and Juan Francisco Sosa from El Salvador, and Colonel Felipe Codallos and Lieutenant Colonel José Luis González Ojeda from Guatemala.

Filísola sent a message of the armistice to Agustín, who had assumed the throne of the Mexican Empire on 19 May 1822 becoming Emperor Agustín I. Agustín rejected the armistice. He believed that the armistice was not enough to ensure the loyalty of El Salvador, and ordered Filísola to again occupy San Salvador and extract a total submission to Mexican authority from its government. Additionally, on 10 November 1822, the Salvadoran congress declared that it was not able to ratify the armistice, and that El Salvador would defend its rights with force.

Following Agustín's orders, Filísola exited Guatemala City on 11 November 1822 with 2,000 troops to occupy San Salvador. In response to Filísola's invasion, Delgado sent a message to the Mexican government offering full annexation on the sole condition that representatives from El Salvador would be allowed to participate in the formulation of the new Mexican constitution. Before Filísola's forces invaded El Salvador, the Salvadoran government junta sent an envoy of diplomats to Washington, D.C. to formally request annexation to the United States in an attempt to avoid being completely conquered by Mexican forces. During this time, a rumor spread in El Salvador that the United States had sent an expeditionary force of 1,500 soldiers to enforce the annexation, but no such expedition existed. The envoy arrived in mid-1823, but they were not invited to meet either President James Monroe or Secretary of State John Quincy Adams. By then, the Mexican Empire had already collapsed.

On 7 December 1822, Filísola occupied the Salvadoran city of Coatepeque. On 21 December 1822, he was informed that Arce's soldiers had fortified themselves in the cities of San Miguel, San Martín, and Cojutepeque, and that Delgado's symbolic religious support was boosting public morale in San Salvador. Although the Mexican army numbered 5,000 soldiers and the Salvadoran forces numbered less than 1,000 and were armed with only machetes and spears, Filísola recognized that attempting to subjugate the rebel army would be difficult. Filísola issued an ultimatum to Arce on 14 January 1823, stating that annexation to the United States was hopeless and that annexation to the Mexican Empire was inevitable; Arce sent Filísola a response the following day, rejecting the ultimatum.

After the rejection, Mexican forces marched on Apopa and Ayutuxtepeque on 7 February 1823, all while being attacked by Salvadoran soldiers using guerrilla tactics. The Salvadoran soldiers defending San Salvador fled the city that same day, and two days later, on 9 February 1823, Filísola captured San Salvador. The Salvadoran soldiers who fled the city retreated to Honduras under the command of Mariano Prado, where they later surrendered to Filísola near the town of Gualcince on 21 February 1823.

Civil war in Costa Rica 

The Electoral Junta was established in Costa Rica on 5 January 1822 after the Interim Junta was abolished, and five days later, the Electoral Junta approved Costa Rica's annexation to the Mexican Empire. The election was held on 31 January 1822.

In October 1822, some Costa Ricans became frustrated with Agustín when he abolished the Constituent Congress without a new constitution being drafted. The frustrations divided Costa Rican politicians on whether to remain with Mexico or to secede. On 8 March 1823, the Superior Gubernatorial Junta voted to secede from Mexico, declaring: "The Province of Costa Rica shall be absolutely free and independent of any power, therefore in the use of its rights and the current congress in the exercise of its sovereignty." The declaration of independence was not universally agreed upon by all Costa Rican politicians, leading to a civil conflict among the Costa Rican ruling class between those in favor of independence (republicans) and those in favor of remaining with Mexico (monarchists).

On 14 March 1823, the Superior Gubernatorial Junta was dissolved in favor of the Provincial Deputation led by Rafael Francisco Osejo. Osejo and the new government, however, were overthrown in a coup d'état by monarchist Joaquín de Oreamuno on 29 March 1823. Republican Gregorio José Ramírez was declared as the leader of Costa Rica in opposition of Oreamuno in the city of Alajuela on 1 April 1823.

Ramírez led republican forces in battle against the monarchists on 5 April 1823 in the Battle of Ochomogo. The battle ended in a republican victory and the overthrow of Oreamuno. Afterwards, Ramírez assumed the position of absolute leader of Costa Rica.

Unrest in Nicaragua 

José Anacleto Ordóñez, a Nicaraguan soldier and merchant, launched a rebellion against Mexican rule on 16 January 1823. He and his supporters bloodlessly captured the military barracks in Granada. This was followed by a series of lootings and robberies by Ordóñez's supporters in the cities of Granada, Jinotepe, Juigalpa, and Masaya. The violence caused many in the affected cities to flee to Managua, which remained under the control of pro-Mexican forces.

On 23 February 1823, Nicaraguan governor  forcibly recaptured Granada with an army of 1,000 soldiers, forcing Ordóñez and his supporters to flee the city. Ordóñez bestowed upon himself the title of caudillo and retreated to Masaya, where he continued his rebellion. On 17 April 1823, González Saravia stepped down as the governor of Nicaragua and was replaced by José Carmen Salazar. Five days later, Ordóñez's rebel forces captured Crisanto Sacasa, the pro-Mexican commander of Granada, and held him as a prisoner of war. Salazar attempted to make peace with Ordóñez's rebellion, but Ordoñez's rebellion continued well past the independence of Central America, resulting in Ordóñez overthrowing the government of Pablo Méndez in August 1824.

Independence from Mexico

Abdication of Agustín 

After the subjugation of El Salvador, Filísola planned to continue his campaign for Mexican control of Central America, including subjugating the rebellious city of Granada and solidifying control of Costa Rica. Before he could continue, however, he heard news about a military-led plot to depose Agustín. Filísola returned to Guatemala City in March 1823, abandoning his orders to complete the annexation of Central America.

Agustín was forced to abdicate the Mexican throne and go into exile on 19 March 1823, marking the end of the Mexican Empire. In its place, three Mexican military officers—Nicolás Bravo, Guadalupe Victoria, and Pedro Negrete—established the Supreme Executive Power, serving as joint heads of state of a provisional government formed in the wake of the abolition of the Mexican monarchy. On 29 March 1823, after news of Agustín's abdication reached Filísola, he called for the formation of a Central American congress to decide the future of Central America. On 1 April 1823, the Mexican Constituent Congress instructed Mexican forces in Central America to cease hostilities with anti-annexation and republican forces, and Filísola expressed his support for the Central American people to determine their own "destiny".

On 7 May 1823, Filísola appointed Codallos, who was his second-in-command during the campaign to annex El Salvador, as the military chief of San Salvador in his absence. Less than one month later on 25 May 1823, Salvadorans managed to pressure Codallos and the garrison of 500 Mexican and Guatemalan soldiers under his command to leave San Salvador. In his place, Salvadoran politicians and military leaders established another Consultive Junta, based in San Salvador. The junta was composed of Prado, Colonel José Justo Milla, and Colonel José Rivas. The junta was later dissolved on 17 June 1823 and Prado assumed sole governance of El Salvador.

Central American congress 

On 18 June 1823, the Mexican congress instructed Filísola to be in attendance of the upcoming session of the Central American congress and to maintain friendly relations in the hope that the congress would vote to remain a part of Mexico. The Mexican congress did instruct him, however, to respect the Central American congress' decision whether to remain in union with Mexico or to become an independent state.

The session of the Central American congress began on 29 June 1823 with representatives from El Salvador, Guatemala, and Mexico in attendance. Chiapas, Costa Rica, Honduras, and Nicaragua stated that they would boycott the conference until Filísola resigned as captain general and withdrew all Mexican forces from Central America. During the congress, 37 of the 41 representatives voted to appoint Delgado as the president of the congress, then known as the National Constituent Assembly of Central America.

On 1 July 1823, the National Constituent Assembly of Central America issued the Decree of Absolute Independence of the Provinces of Central America, declaring independence from Mexico and reaffirming independence from Spain. The declaration formed the United Provinces of Central America. Chiapas, however, did not join the newly declared Central American state, choosing to remain a part of Mexico. Its decision to remain with Mexico was confirmed in a referendum on 26 May 1824.

After the residents of Guatemala City raised enough money to pay for the Mexican army's withdrawal, Filísola and his soldiers withdrew from Guatemala and returned to Chiapas on 3 August 1823. The United Provinces of Central America, later known as the Federal Republic of Central America, continued to exist until its 1841 collapse following the First and Second Central American Civil Wars.

Central America's independence led many Mexican provinces to desire increased regional autonomy for themselves. Most provinces called upon the national government to establish a new national congress as they believed those under Agustín were illegitimate. Meanwhile, the provinces of Oaxaca, Yucatán, and Zacatecas announced the establishments of their own local juntas in place of a national congress, and San Luis Potosí and the Eastern Interior Provinces stated that they would declare independence from Mexico unless a new congress was established.

Government

Captaincy government 

During Mexico's annexation of the region, Mexico and Central America had the same heads of state. Agustín ruled as regent, and then as emperor, from January 1822 until his abdication in March 1823, after which, the three leaders of the provisional government—Bravo, Victoria, and Negrete—served as joint heads of state.

At the regional level, the five provinces were organized into the Captaincy General of Guatemala, and the captaincy general was governed by a captain general from the capital in Guatemala City. The position of captain general existed throughout Mexico's rule, and it was held by Gaínza, Filísola, and Codallos.

 Color key

Individual provincial governments 

The following are lists of the political leaders of the five individual provinces. Control of the provinces changed multiple times between monarchists in favor of annexation and republicans in favor of secession, usually as a result of conflicts and unrest within the provinces.

 Color key

Costa Rica

El Salvador

Guatemala

Honduras

Nicaragua

Representation in the national legislature 

The Mexican Constituent Congress was established on 24 February 1822 and was tasked with drafting a constitution for the Mexican Empire. In November 1821, the Mexican government decided on the electoral procedures to select representatives for the Constituent Congress, which it decided would consist of 162 members. After Central America joined the empire, Agustín wanted to extend congressional representation to the region. Due to unavailable demographic data at the time, Agustín reluctantly allowed Central America to have 40 representatives in the Constituent Congress, which he thought was a "prudent" amount. Despite being allowed to have 40 representatives, only 38 were elected.

The following is a list of Central America's representatives in the Constituent Congress:

Chiapas: 7
 José Anselmo Lara
 Pedro Celís
 Bonifacio Fernández de Córdova
 Luciano Figueroa
 Juan María Lazaga
 Manuel de Mier y Terán
 Marcial Zebadúa

Costa Rica: 2
 José Antonio Alvarado
 José Francisco de Peralta

El Salvador: 0

Guatemala: 15
 José Antonio Acayaga
 Pedro Arrollave
 Tomás Beltranena
 Mariano de Aycinena y Piñol
 
 
 José Ignacio Grijalva
 Mariano Larrabe
 Miguel Larreynaga
 
 Pedro Molina Mazariegos
 Isidoro Montúfar
 José Vicente Orantes
 Antonio Rivera Cabezas
 Joaquín Yúdice

Honduras: 10
 Cayetano Bosque
 Próspero de Herrera
 José Cecilio del Valle
 Manuel Gutiérrez
 Joaquín Lindo
 Juan Lindo
 Francisco Antonio Márquez
 José Santiago Milla
 Jacinto Rubí
 

Nicaragua: 4
 
 Manuel López de la Plata
 Joaquín Herdosia
 Juan José Quiñones

Agustín abolished the Constituent Congress on 31 October 1822 before a constitution was approved, and replaced it with the National Institutional Junta. Of the 55-member legislature, 13 were from Central America. The Central American representatives in the National Institutional Junta were Arrollave, Beltranena, Celís, de la Plata, Fernández de Córdova, Figueroa, Gutiérrez, Larreynaga, Montúfar, Orantes, Peralta, Quiñones, and Rubí. The National Institutional Junta was abolished on 29 March 1823, five months after it formed and shortly after Agustín abdicated.

Economy 

For Mexico, the annexation of Central America was seen as a way to help stabilize the country's struggling economy, especially the mining and agricultural industries, after a decade of fighting against Spanish rule. Central America's annexation offered the Mexican government a larger tax base, which would help the country rebuild its infrastructure. Additionally, leaders in Central America saw annexation as a way to help its own economy.

Upon gaining independence from Spain in September 1821, the Central American government owed 3,138,451 pesos of foreign debt; by October 1823, after the end of the period of Mexican rule, the debt increased to 3,583,576 pesos. Further economic difficulties included a decline in indigo production which predated independence, the decline of textile production to a "state of extreme decadence" due to competing English cotton goods, and the government's failure to collect 385,693 pesos in taxes from the provinces. In an attempt to alleviate its debt and economic troubles, the captaincy general passed a tariff law in 1822, placing taxes on various exports from Central America, and made the exporting of coins illegal. That same year, Gaínza issued 40,000 pesos in the form of banknotes, which was the first use of paper money in Central America. The Central American federal government eventually defaulted on its debt the mid-1820s.

Sometime between 1823 and 1825, a congressional commission by the government of the Federal Republic of Central America began an investigation into why the mint in Guatemala City had been "reduced" to the "condition of insignificance" it was in. Initially, the commission believed that the mint was "despoiled" between 1822 and 1823 by Gaínza and Filísola, who supposedly used the mint to directly fund their military operations in the annexation of El Salvador. Additionally, the residents of Guatemala City were forced to raise enough money to pay for the Mexican army's withdrawal from Central America in August 1823. Eventually, the commission's initial belief was proven incorrect, as it later found that the reason the mint had been producing less money was that the mint failed to make loans to miners.

To celebrate the incorporation of Central America into the Mexican Empire, Agustín authorized the minting of proclamation medals in gold, silver, and bronze; however, the medals did not have any monetary value. Four types of medals were struck for Central America dating to late-1822 for Chiapas, Quetzaltenango, Guatemala, and León; the location of where the medals were minted is unknown.

See also 

 History of Central America
 Relations of Mexico with Central America
 Costa Rica–Mexico relations
 El Salvador–Mexico relations
 Guatemala–Mexico relations
 Honduras–Mexico relations
 Nicaragua–Mexico relations

Notes

References

Citations

Bibliography

Books

Journal articles

Web sources

Further reading

External links 

 Act of Annexation of Central America to the Mexican Empire (in Spanish) from the National Assembly of Nicaragua

19th century in Central America
19th century in Costa Rica
19th century in El Salvador
19th century in Guatemala
19th century in Honduras
19th century in Nicaragua
1822 establishments in Mexico
1823 disestablishments in Mexico
1822 in Central America
1823 in Central America
History of Central America
History of Chiapas
Costa Rica–Mexico relations
El Salvador–Mexico relations
Guatemala–Mexico relations
Honduras–Mexico relations
Mexico–Nicaragua relations
Mexican Empire